Callaway, legally Topgolf Callaway Brands Corp., is an American global sports equipment manufacturing company that designs, manufactures, markets and sells golf equipment, more specifically clubs and balls, also including accessories such as bags, gloves, and caps. The company also produces clothing through its subsidiary "Callaway Apparel,” and golf shoes, through its "Cuater" subsidiary. In 2021 The company purchased Topgolf, and thus also operates a chain of golf-related amusement and events centers.

The company sells its products through golf retailers and sporting goods retailers, through mass merchants, directly online, and through its pre-owned and trade-in services. Callway markets its products in more than 70 countries worldwide. The company, based in Carlsbad, California, is the world's largest manufacturer of golf clubs.

In past years, Callaway marketed products under the "Toulon Design" and "Odyssey" putter brand's, acquired in 1997, as well as "Top Flite", "Strata" and "Ben Hogan" brands picked up following the bankruptcy of Spalding's former golf division in 2003.

History 
Callaway Golf Company was founded by former Burlington Industries textile president, Ely Callaway Jr. Callaway was raised in LaGrange, Georgia, and was a graduate of Emory University. He had previously been successful in the textile and wine industries, and was also an avid golfer. Among his favorite club brands was Hickory Sticks USA, which was known for producing clubs with hickory shafts and steel cores. At that time, Hickory Sticks was owned by Richard Parente, Dick De La Cruz, and Tony Manzoni. When Hickory Sticks started running low on funds, they began seeking investors and approached Callaway, who had just sold his vineyards for a $9 million profit. In 1982, he bought half of Hickory Sticks USA and the company was renamed "Callaway Hickory Stick USA." In 1983, he became the company's president and moved its headquarters to Carlsbad, California where he could be found selling clubs out of his Cadillac. In 1984, Callaway bought the rest of the company for another $400,000. The company's name was changed to its present name in 1988.

In 1985, the company hired Bruce Parker as head of sales, who later became the company's Chief Merchant and, through his tenure with Callaway Golf as head of sales, was responsible for sales in excess of $3.0 billion. He was involved in all major decisions during the company's growth.

In 1986, Callaway hired a billiard cue designer, Richard C. Helmstetter, as a consultant. Helmstetter was named chief club designer that same year and introduced computer-controlled manufacturing machines. With his help and that of Glenn Schmidt, the company's master tool maker, the company developed the original Big Bertha driver using large-volume (190cc) steel clubhead. The Big Bertha driver grew to 290 cc in 1997.

In 1996, the company hired Roger Cleveland as chief club designer and in 2002, launched the Callaway Golf Forged Wedges, constructed from carbon steel with modified U-grooved faces.

In 1996, Callaway announced development of a new golf ball, under the leadership of Chuck Yash, the former head of Taylormade Golf. Callaway Golf spent three years developing the ball and a state-of-the-art production facility. The company invested $170 million in research and development, and construction of the  production facility.

Callaway Golf Company engineers, recruited from Du Pont and Boeing, used aerodynamic computer programs (first used by Boeing and General Electric) to evaluate more than 300 dimple patterns and more than 1,000 variations of ball cores, boundary layers, and cover materials to create the new Rule 35 ball. They settled on only two versions of the Rule 35 ball—choosing to develop a "complete-performance" ball rather than separate balls developed for spin, control, distance, and durability. Ely Callaway explained the company's product development objectives as follows: "We have combined all of the performance benefits into one ball so players no longer need to sacrifice control for distance, or feel, or durability. Each Rule 35 ball contains a unique synergy of distance, control, spin, feel and durability characteristics. This eliminates confusion and guesswork in trying to identify the golf ball that is right for each individual golfer."

In 1997, Odyssey Sports was acquired, expanding Callaway's line of putters. This led to introduction of the Odyssey White Hot putter line in 2000.

Ely Callaway resigned as CEO and president in 1996, remaining as chairman of the board. Donald H. Dye was named CEO and president. Callaway also continued as president and CEO of Callaway Golf Ball Company. In 1998 he again became president and CEO of Callaway Golf Company, but died of pancreatic cancer on July 5, 2001. Ron Drapeau assumed his positions.

In 2003 Drapeau announced the company's intention to purchase Top-Flite Golf and its Ben Hogan Golf division, soon after it filed for Chapter 11 bankruptcy. Due to competition from Adidas, the acquisition cost Callaway Golf $169 million.

On November 8, 2004, Callaway Golf named chairman and chief executive William C. Baker president and COO, replacing Patrice Hutin.

In August 2005, George Fellows was named president and CEO of Callaway Golf. He retained this position until June 2011.

In 2012, Oliver "Chip" Gordon Brewer III was named CEO of Callaway. Callaway sold the Top-Flite brand to Dick's Sporting Goods, citing declining sales, and the Ben Hogan brand to Perry Ellis International, with Callaway retaining several trademarks, including Apex and Edge.

In 2017, Callaway acquired OGIO, a US-based bag and apparel brand, and TravisMathew, a California-based lifestyle and golf apparel brand.

In 2019, Callaway acquired German outdoor apparel company Jack Wolfskin.

In 2020, Joe Flannery was named Executive Vice President of Callaway.

On October 27, 2020, Callaway announced it will acquire Topgolf Entertainment Group for $2 billion.

On August 24, 2022, Callaway Golf Company announced plans to change its corporate name to Topgolf Callaway Brands Corp.

Effective September 7, 2022, Topgolf Callaway Brands Corp. changed its ticker symbol on the New York Stock Exchange from "ELY" to "MODG".

Financial
In February 1992, Callaway Golf went public on the New York Stock Exchange with a market capitalization of $250 million. By late 1997, it reached a market capitalization of over $3.0 billion.

Endorsements
Callaway has maintained endorsement deals with many professional golfers who play on the world's leading tours, including Sam Burns, Emiliano Grillo, Francesco Molinari, Jon Rahm, Xander Schauffele and Henrik Stenson. They have also had commercial relationships with some of the legends of the sport including Arnold Palmer and Annika Sörenstam, and celebrities such as Justin Timberlake and Stephen Curry. After being endorsed by Callaway late in his career, Seve Ballesteros expressed his gratitude to Ely Callaway by giving him a vintage Rolex, one he had worn since he first signed with the watchmaker.

Awards
On December 8, 2005, Callaway Golf received the 2005 Torch Award for Marketplace Ethics, from the San Diego Better Business Bureau.

References

External links

1982 establishments in California
1992 initial public offerings
American companies established in 1982
Clothing companies established in 1982
Manufacturing companies established in 1982
Clothing brands of the United States
Companies based in Carlsbad, California
Companies listed on the New York Stock Exchange
Golf equipment manufacturers
Golf in the United States
Manufacturing companies based in California
Sporting goods manufacturers of the United States
Sportswear brands
Callaway family